Lee Chung-Woong (born March 15, 1993) is a South Korean former football player who played as a defensive midfielder or centre back for Busan IPark.

Club career 
Lee made his professional debut for Busan IPark on 22 August 2015 in a 1-0 defeat to Seongnam. His first goal for the club was the winning goal in a 2-1 victory over Gyeongnam in the FA Cup on 27 April 2016. Lee completed his military service with K4 League side Siheung Citizen before returning to parent club Busan IPark midway through the 2021 K League 2 season. He announced his retirement in September 2022 at the age of 29.

Club career statistics

References

External links 

1993 births
Living people
South Korean footballers
Association football midfielders
K League 1 players
K League 2 players
Busan IPark players